Kalvilan is a town located in the Mullaitivu District in the Northern Province of Sri Lanka.

References

Towns in Mullaitivu District
Thunukkai DS Division